Muthia or Muthiya is a Gujarati dish. The name is derived from the way it is made, from the 'gripping' action of the hand. It  is a vegetarian dish. It is made up of chickpea flour, methi (fenugreek), salt, turmeric, chili powder, and an optional bonding agent/sweetener such as sugar and oil. 

This dish can be eaten steamed or fried (after steaming).
In Gujarat, this item is known as Muthiya/Velaniya/Vaataa etc. 
This item is known as 'vaataa' in Charotar area located in Central Gujarat.
Other varieties are made by using coarse flour of wheat and leafy vegetables such as amaranth, spinach, Luni or grated bottle gourd or peel of bitter gourd (karela)
After steaming, they are tempered with sesame seeds and mustard seeds.

References

External links
 Muthia recipe

Gujarati cuisine
Indian snack foods